The Alzette is a river with a length of  in France and Luxembourg. It is a right tributary of the Sauer (a tributary to the Moselle), and ultimately to the Rhine.

It rises in Thil near the town Villerupt in the Meurthe-et-Moselle département, France. It crosses the border with Luxembourg after . At Lameschmillen (near Bergem) it is joined by the Mess. It flows through the Luxembourgish towns Esch-sur-Alzette, Luxembourg City and Mersch, and empties into the Sauer near Ettelbruck.

The rocky cliffs above the Alzette in Luxembourg are called 'Bock'. This name was given to the Casemates du Bock; a honeycomb of tunnels colloquially named 'Paula', which runs under the ruins of the Fortress of Luxembourg. It protected Luxembourg City for centuries.

References

 
International rivers of Europe
Rivers of the Ardennes (Luxembourg)
Rivers of Luxembourg
Rivers of France
Rivers of Grand Est
Rivers of Meurthe-et-Moselle
Rivers of Ettelbruck
Rivers of Luxembourg City
Rivers of Mersch
Esch-sur-Alzette